The second Hancock was one of the first 13 frigates of the Continental Navy. A resolution of the Continental Congress of British North America 13 December 1775 authorized her construction; she was named for  the patriot and Continental congressman John Hancock. In her career she served under the American, British and French flags.

As Hancock
Hancock was built at Newburyport, Massachusetts, and placed under command of Captain John Manley 17 April 1776. After a long delay in fitting out and manning, she departed Boston, Massachusetts, on 21 May 1777 in company with Continental frigate  and the Massachusetts privateer American Tartar for a cruise in the North Atlantic. American Tartar parted from the two frigates shortly thereafter.

On 29 May the frigates captured a small brig loaded with cordage and duck. The next day they encountered a convoy of transports escorted by British 64-gun ship  which set sail to close Hancock. Manley was saved by clever and well-timed action of Boston, which forced Somerset to give up the chase by taking on the transports.

After escaping from Somerset, the two frigates sailed to the northeast until 7 June when they engaged the Royal Navy's 28-gun frigate , which tried to outsail her American enemies. Hancock gave chase and soon overhauled Fox, which lost her mainmast and suffered other severe damage in the ensuing duel. About an hour later, Boston joined the battle and compelled Fox to strike her colors.

Hancock spent the next few days repairing the prize and then resumed cruising along the coast of New England. East of Cape Sable she took a British coal sloop which she towed until the next morning when the approach of a British squadron prompted Manley to set the coal sloop ablaze and leave her adrift. The British frigate HMS Flora recaptured Fox after a hot action. 
 
Boston became separated from Hancock, which tried to outsail her pursuers. Early in the morning 8 July 1777 the British were within striking distance.  began to score with her bowchasers and followed with a series of broadsides. Hancock was thus finally forced to strike her colors after a chase of some 39 hours. She had 239 men of her crew aboard, 50 some being on Fox. She also had Captain Fotheringham of Fox and 40 of his people on board. The rest were on Boston and a couple of fishing vessels.

As HMS Iris
Hancock, renamed Iris, served the British Navy so effectively that her new owners boasted of her as "the finest and fastest frigate in the world."

On 21 and 23 April 1780 Iris, and  captured the American privateers Amazon, '"General Wayne, and Neptune. The capture had taken place a few leagues from Sandy Hook and Iris and Delaware brought them into New York on 1 May.

The most famous of the many prizes which made her officers wealthy men was the capture on 28 August 1781 of the American 28-gun ship . Trumbull carried 32 guns and 200 men. Iris captured her after an engagement of about an hour in which Iris lost one man killed and six wounded, while Trumbull had two men killed and 10 wounded.

In the aftermath of the Battle of the Chesapeake, admirals Graves and Hood left the Chesapeake waters; the French set a solid screen of fast frigates to intercept enemy shipping. Prior to retreating, Hood dispatched two frigates, Iris and Richmond, to General Cornwallis in Yorktown. On 9 September 1781, four French frigates intercepted them; Richmond fell back and surrendered first, then the French frigate Aigrette, under captain Traversay, captured Iris. Traversay boarded Iris, assumed command and held it till the end of war.

As Royal French Iris
On 4 November 1781, Iris, with the main French fleet, sailed from Annapolis to the Antilles. In January 1782 Iris took part in the Battle of St. Kitts. Iris captured a small British sloop. On the eve of Battle of the Saintes Admiral de Grasse detached Iris to convoy unarmed troop transports; Iris completed her mission. In the late stages of the war Iris continued reconnaissance and cruising, and finally performed a diplomatic mission when she carried an offer of a ceasefire to British-occupied New York.

Fate
The French Navy sold Iris'' in 1784.

See also

List of ships captured in the 18th century
Bibliography of early American naval history

Footnotes

Notes

Citations

References

 
  (1671-1870)

External links
 History of the Royal Navy – HMS Hancock, May 1777.

 

Ships of the Continental Navy
Sailing frigates of the United States Navy
Ships built in Newburyport, Massachusetts
1776 ships
Vessels captured from the United States Navy
Shipwrecks in the Mediterranean Sea
Ships named for Founding Fathers of the United States